Telugu Yuvatha (translation: Telugu Youth) is the youth wing of the Telugu Desam Party in India.

Leader of Telugu Yuvatha of Telugu Desam Party in Andhra Pradesh is 'Sri Ram Chinnababu' from Madanapalle constituency.

References

Youth wings of political parties in India
Telugu Desam Party
Year of establishment missing